Calytrix erosipetala is a species of plant in the myrtle family Myrtaceae that is endemic to Western Australia.

It blooms between September and October producing white-pink star-shaped flowers.

Found among granite breakaways in the eastern Mid West and the south western Goldfields-Esperance regions of Western Australia where it grows on rocky sandstone based soils.

References

Plants described in 1987
erosipetala
Flora of Western Australia